Concrete sealers are applied to concrete to protect it from surface damage, corrosion, and staining. They either block the pores in the concrete to reduce absorption of water and salts or form an impermeable layer which prevents such materials from passing.  

Research from major concrete authorities, including the American Concrete Institute, Portland Cement Association, and the National Ready Mixed Concrete Association confirm that most concrete damage is attributable to surface moisture intrusion. The most pervasive form of concrete damage is surface scaling from freeze/thaw.  Other forms of damage include alkali-silica reaction (ASR), chemical intrusion, and corrosion of steel reinforcements.

Types 

In past decades attempts to protect concrete have included sealers ranging from wax to linseed oil.  Today, high quality concrete sealers can block up to 99% of surface moisture.  There are two main sealer categories:  topical sealers (coatings) and penetrating sealers (reactive).

Topical sealers
Topical sealers can provide visual enhancement as well as topical protection from stains and chemicals.  They require a dry, clean surface during application to gain adhesion.  Topical sealers may alter the coefficient of friction which can make substrates slick when wet – a condition that can be remedied by adding anti-skid materials. Life span is generally 1-5 years, although high-end epoxy/urethane systems can last significantly longer.

Penetrating sealers
Penetrating sealers can be applied to dry or damp surfaces and should be properly matched with substrate porosity in order to effectively penetrate the surface and react.  The chemical reaction bonds active ingredients within the substrate blocking surface moisture.  Penetrating sealers generally do not significantly modify substrate appearance or traction. Lifespan is generally 5 years or more.

Concrete sealer chemistries

Acrylic resins
Acrylic resins form a topical film membrane on the substrate surface.  They are available in both water-based and solvent-based formulas, affordable, and generally simple to apply. They are well known to increase perceived visual enhancement (sometimes described as a “wet look”) and can provide good UV protection for colored substrates.  Despite being the softest and least lasting of the major sealer categories, price and convenience make acrylic resins a very popular choice for decorative concrete such as stamped concrete and exposed aggregate. Acrylic resins are also commonly used as curing agents for new concrete, and many comply with ASTM C309.

Epoxy/polyurethane systems
Epoxy/polyurethane systems are also topical film membranes.  They share many of the same characteristics as acrylics, but the performance levels and life span are superior and commensurately more costly with more complex installation requirements.  Novolak (or Novolac) epoxies are particularly noted for chemical resistance and acid resistance.  High-end polyurethanes are known to be extremely abrasion resistant.  Epoxy/polyurethane systems are frequently used in demanding applications such as factory floors, garage floors, and restaurants, and water-based versions are often used to seal concrete countertops.  Epoxy/polyurethane systems are generally applied only to fully cured existing concrete, although certain epoxy products can comply with ASTM C309.

Silane
Silane is the smallest molecular compound of commonly available penetrating sealers.  Chemically, silane forms a covalent bond within porous masonry that clots surface pores.  Silane is known to be hydrophobic and oleophobic.  It lasts 12-17 years before reapplication is needed. Abrasion is not a significant factor as deterioration primarily occurs from the bulk of the concrete outwards towards the surface, suggesting the alkali pore solution of the concrete may be important.  Noted for very low viscosity, silane is frequently used for sealing dense concrete, such as parking decks, concrete facades, and dense brick.  Silane is generally applied only to fully cured existing concrete.

Silicates
Silicates are another small molecular compound ranging from premium lithium silicates to economical sodium silicates.  Chemically, silicates form calcium silicate hydrate crystals which can densify concrete surfaces and be burnished to develop a polished appearance.  Silicates are known to be hydrophobic and oleophobic and will only wear away if the concrete surface itself wears away. Noted for crystallization, silicates are frequently used for polishing concrete floors popular in large format retail outlets.  Silicates can be applied to new and existing concrete, although they do not comply with ASTM C309 as a curing agent.

Lithium silicates
Lithium silicates are another version of traditional silicates that are more stable than those caused by volatile conventional silicates, allowing the material to penetrate and react more evenly throughout the concrete for maximum hardening, sealing, and densification. Other silicates absorb moisture and cause ASR, weakening the substrate over time. Lithium silicates are insoluble, providing maximum water resistance. Lithium silicates completely penetrate the surface of concrete to become part of the structure. It achieves these improved characteristics by incorporating the silica into the concrete structure itself. This effectively fills the pores of the material whilst chemically bonding silica with the calcium base of concrete to deliver a non-porous, densified layer that penetrates up to 10 mm into the concrete.

Silicates
Silicates are moderate-size molecular compounds.  Chemically, silicates form a repellent cross-linking membrane barrier within the surface of porous concrete and other masonry. Silicates are known to be hydrophobic and oleophobic and will only wear away if the concrete surface itself wears away.  Noted for extreme water repellence and stain repellence silicates are frequently used for sealing exterior concrete such as roads and driveways, tilt-up walls, porous brick, and porous stone.  Silicates and organosilicates have also been shown to be affective as curing agents for new concrete and certain products can comply with ASTM C309.

Siloxane
Siloxane is the largest molecular compound of commonly available penetrating sealers.  Although not highly reactive, chemically siloxane forms a bond within porous masonry that clots surface pores.  Siloxane is known to be hydrophobic.  Noted for large molecular structure, siloxane is frequently used for sealing exterior concrete, porous concrete block and porous brick.  Siloxane is generally applied only to fully cured existing concrete.

In summary, all major concrete sealer chemistries can have valuable and practical applications.  Topical sealers generally require higher application standards and maintenance, but the decorative appeal and potential stain and chemical resistance can make them a superior choice for many applications.  Penetrating sealers should be matched with substrate porosity for long lasting low maintenance water repellence and freeze/thaw protection.

Building materials